Tallinn Club de Futbol is an Estonian football club from Tallinn. They play in the II liiga, the fourth highest level of Estonian football league pyramid.

Current squad
''As of 27 May 2015.

References

External links
 Team info at Estonian Football Association

Football clubs in Tallinn